Jamaluddin (born 4 November 1985) is a Pakistani former cricketer. He made his first-class debut for Peshawar in the 2007–08 Quaid-e-Azam Trophy on 19 November 2007. In February 2021, he began to undertake coaching courses with the Pakistan Cricket Board.

References

External links
 

1985 births
Living people
Pakistani cricketers
Peshawar cricketers